Margaret Court defeated Evonne Goolagong in the final, 7–6, 5–7, 6–2 to win the women's singles tennis title at the 1973 US Open. It was her record-extending 24th and last major singles title, an all-time record that still stands.

Billie Jean King was the two-time defending champion, but lost in the third round to Julie Heldman.

Seeds
The seeded players are listed below. Margaret Court is the champion; others show the round in which they were eliminated.

 Billie Jean King (third round)
 Margaret Court (champion)
 Chris Evert (semifinalist)
 Evonne Goolagong (runner-up)
 Kerry Melville (quarterfinalist)
 Rosemary Casals (quarterfinalist)
 Virginia Wade (quarterfinalist)
 Olga Morozova (third round)

Draw

Key
 Q = Qualifier
 WC = Wild card
 LL = Lucky loser
 r = Retired

Final eight

Earlier rounds

Section 1

Section 2

Section 3

Section 4

External links
1973 US Open – Women's draws and results at the International Tennis Federation

Women's Singles
US Open (tennis) by year – Women's singles
1973 in women's tennis
1973 in American women's sports